Castles in Iraq were built in the Ancient and Medieval Times. The castles have played important role in defenses against enemies throughout history.

References 

Iraq
Castles
Iraq
Castles